Boro Janičić (born 1967) is a retired Montenegrin footballer who played as a midfielder.

Club career
He played with FK Sutjeska Nikšić in the Yugoslav Second League between 1988 and 1991.  Then, he played for FC Seoul of the South Korean K League, then known as LG Cheetahs.

References

External links
 
 Photograph at LG Cheetahs

1967 births
Date of birth unknown
Living people
Place of birth missing (living people)
Association football midfielders
Yugoslav footballers
Serbia and Montenegro footballers
FK Sutjeska Nikšić players
FK Obilić players
FK Budućnost Podgorica players
FC Seoul players
Yugoslav Second League players
First League of Serbia and Montenegro players
K League 1 players
Serbia and Montenegro expatriate footballers
Expatriate footballers in South Korea
Serbia and Montenegro expatriate sportspeople in South Korea